The montagne Grande Coulée (in English: Grande Coulée Mountain) is a mountain located at Saint-Paul-de-Montminy, in the Montmagny Regional County Municipality, in the administrative region Chaudière-Appalaches, Quebec, in Canada.

This mountain housed the Grande Coulée ski resort, an alpine ski center which was closed in 1999, and is now part of Appalachian Regional Park. It rises to 853 meters above sea level.

External links 
 Montagne Grande Coulée (Appalachian regional park)

Appalachian summits
Landforms of Chaudière-Appalaches
Notre Dame Mountains
Montmagny Regional County Municipality
Mountains of Quebec under 1000 metres